Navour-sur-Grosne (literally Navour on Grosne) is a commune in the Saône-et-Loire department in the region of Bourgogne-Franche-Comté in eastern France. It was established on 1 January 2019 by merger of the former communes of Clermain (the seat), Brandon and Montagny-sur-Grosne.

See also
Communes of the Saône-et-Loire department

References

Communes of Saône-et-Loire
States and territories established in 2019